The Monument to the Brothers Calvi is a monument places in Piazza Matteoti in front of Palazzo Frizzoni (now the city hall) in the lower town of Bergamo, region of Lombardy, Italy. It commemorates the four brothers, who served as Alpini or mountain infantry, who died during or shortly after the First World War. In the decades after the war, the brothers were revered for their exemplary martyrdom for the Italian nation.

Description

The monument is a pentagonal plinth, made with marble Zandobbio. with a flagpole with the Italian flag atop. On the superior register of the plinth are four bronze nude youths symbolizing the four brothers: Natale (1887 – 1920), Attilio (1889 – 1916), Sante (1895 – 1917), and Giannino (1899 – 1919) who died after service to the nation. In 1921, a ceremony honoring them and their mother was attended by the King, Benito Mussolini, and Gabriele D'Annunzio. Above each male statue are bronze eagles. The fifth side has a striding youthful maiden symbolizing Victory. The marble is simply engraved with the phrase AI FRATELLI CALVI. The marble of this middle register has plaques engraved with depictions of battles in which the brothers were involved.

The monument was completed in 1933, designed by the architect Giuseppe Pizzigoni (1901-1967). The reliefs were completed by Giacomo Manzù. Within weeks of completion, the male genitals were covered up with fig leaves. 

The idea of a monument to a sibship sacrificed for the country is also celebrated in the Monument to the Cairoli Brothers located on the Pincian Hill in Rome; however, unlike that 1872 Romantic monument, the images of the Calvi monument, are less individualized, and are represented by nonspecific muscular youth subsumed into a national struggle.

References

Buildings and structures in Bergamo
1933 sculptures
Buildings and structures completed in 1933
Monuments and memorials in Lombardy
Cultural depictions of Italian men
20th-century architecture in Italy
Fascist architecture